Rachel Erickson (born January 9, 1999) is a Canadian curler from Maryfield, Saskatchewan. She is currently the lead on Team Chelsea Carey. She was the alternate for the Mackenzie Zacharias rink that won the 2020 World Junior Curling Championships.

Career
Erickson's first national championships was in 2016 at the 2016 U18 International Curling Championships where she skipped Saskatchewan to a 3–2 record. She won the provincial championship again the following year and finished 3–5 at the 2017 Canadian U18 Curling Championships. Two years later, she won her first provincial junior title and finished in seventh place with a 5–5 record at the 2019 Canadian Junior Curling Championships in her home province. She joined the Ashley Thevenot rink at third the following season and the team won the provincial junior championship. Erickson would once again settle for a seventh place finish at the 2020 Canadian Junior Curling Championships, once again with a 5–5 record. She was then asked by the winners of the event, Manitoba's Mackenzie Zacharias if she would join them at the 2020 World Junior Curling Championships in Krasnoyarsk, Russia. After finishing the round robin in second place, they would defeat Russia in the semifinal and South Korea in the final to claim the gold medal. Erickson played in one game at the championship, where Canada defeated Latvia 13–2.

Erickson aged out of juniors after the season. On March 19, 2020, it was announced that she would be joining the new team of Stephanie Schmidt, Brooklyn Stevenson, and Jennifer Armstrong for the 2020–21 season. The team played in three local events during the abbreviated season, qualifying in one of them. After the season, Brooklyn Stevenson left the team. Erickson, Schmidt and Armstrong then added Chelsea Carey and Jolene Campbell for the 2021–22 season, shifting Erickson to alternate. Also during the 2020–21 season, Erickson made her first appearance at the Scotties as the alternate for Team Zacharias, who represented Wild Card #2. At the 2021 Scotties Tournament of Hearts in Calgary, Alberta, the team finished with a 3–5 round robin record, failing to qualify for the championship round.

The new Team Carey found success in just their second event together, going undefeated to claim the Craven SPORTS Services Curling Classic tour event title. They then made the semifinals of the 2021 Curlers Corner Autumn Gold Curling Classic where they were eliminated by Tabitha Peterson. At the event, however, they were able to defeat the likes of Rachel Homan, Jennifer Jones and Jamie Sinclair en route to the semifinals. They also qualified for the playoffs at the Boundary Ford Curling Classic, SaskTour Women's Moose Jaw, Red Deer Curling Classic and the DeKalb Superspiel, however, were not able to reach the final in any of the four events. Their next event was the 2022 Saskatchewan Scotties Tournament of Hearts, which they entered as the top ranked team. Team Carey qualified through the A-side of the tournament with a perfect 3–0 record. This earned them a spot in the 1 vs. 2 page playoff game where they defeated Penny Barker. In the final, they once again faced the Barker rink. This time, Team Barker would win the match 7–5, despite Team Carey beating them in both the A Final and 1 vs. 2 page playoff game. Despite this, they still qualified for the 2022 Scotties Tournament of Hearts as Wild Card #2 after Curling Canada used the same format from the 2021 event. At the championship, the team finished with a 4–4 round robin record, not advancing to the playoff round. Team Carey wrapped up their season at the 2022 Players' Championship where they missed the playoffs.

On April 3, 2022, the team announced that they would be disbanding at the end of the 2021–22 season. Erickson, Carey and Campbell later announced that they would be staying together and adding Liz Fyfe to the team for the 2022–23 season.

Personal life
Erickson was an Agronomy student at the University of Saskatchewan. She currently works as an agronomist with Advantage Co-op and lives in Maryfield, Saskatchewan.

Teams

References

External links

1999 births
Canadian women curlers
Curlers from Manitoba
Living people
Curlers from Saskatoon
Sportspeople from Brandon, Manitoba
University of Saskatchewan alumni
20th-century Canadian women
21st-century Canadian women